Giovanna Granieri Fiorini (born 15 November 1974 in Todi) is an Italian former basketball player.

References

1974 births
Living people
People from Todi
Italian women's basketball players
Sportspeople from the Province of Perugia
20th-century Italian women